Warren School District is a public school district based in Warren, Arkansas, United States. The school district provides early childhood, elementary and secondary education from its four schools in Bradley County, Arkansas.

It includes Warren and Banks.

History
Banks School District consolidated into Warren School District on July 1, 1985.

Schools 
 Warren High School 
 Warren Middle School 
 Brunson New Vision Charter School (Fourth through Fifth Grade) 
 Eastside Elementary School (Kindergarten through Third Grade) 
 Warren ABC Preschool

References

Further reading
  (Download) - Includes predecessor districts

External links 
 

School districts in Arkansas
Education in Bradley County, Arkansas